Jarno Pihlava (born 14 May 1979 in Raisio, Finland) is a retired male breaststroke swimmer from Finland. He twice competed for his native country at the Summer Olympics: in 2000 and 2004.

References

1979 births
Living people
People from Raisio
Finnish male breaststroke swimmers
Swimmers at the 2000 Summer Olympics
Swimmers at the 2004 Summer Olympics
Olympic swimmers of Finland
Medalists at the FINA World Swimming Championships (25 m)
European Aquatics Championships medalists in swimming
Sportspeople from Southwest Finland